Zákolany is a municipality and village in Kladno District in the Central Bohemian Region of the Czech Republic. It has about 600 inhabitants.

Administrative parts
Villages of Kováry and Trněný Újezd are administrative parts of Zákolany.

Geography
The municipality lies in the Prague Plateau, in the valley of the Zákolanský Stream.

History
The first written mention of Zákolany is from 1282.

Sights
Zákolany is known for Budeč, which was a  large gord founded by the first members of the Přemyslid dynasty. The Rotunda of Saints Peter and Paul was built here after 895. The nave of the rotunda is the oldest preserved building in the Czech Republic.

Notable people
Wenceslaus I, Duke of Bohemia (c. 907 – c. 935), saint; studied in Budeč
Antonín Zápotocký (1884–1957), communist politician, president of Czechoslovakia in 1953–1957

References

External links

Villages in Kladno District